Shanir Ezra Blumenkranz  (born 1975 in Brooklyn, NY) is an American bassist and oud player who has recorded and performed extensively with Cyro Baptista's Banquet of the Spirits, Daniel Zamir's Satlah, Rashanim, and Pharaoh's Daughter, and John Zorn. Blumenkranz studied at the Manhattan School of Music, the Rimon School of Music in Israel, and holds a Bachelor of Music in Performance from Berklee College of Music in Boston. In 2012 he released the first album under his leadership Abraxas: Book of Angels Volume 19 featuring compositions by John Zorn.

Discography

As leader
Abraxas: Book of Angels Volume 19 (Tzadik, 2013)
Psychomagia (Tzadik, 2014) with Abraxas

With others
With Aram Bajakian 
Aram Bajakian's Kef (Tzadik, 2011)
With Cyro Baptista's Banquet of the Spirits
Banquet of the Spirits (Tzadik, 2008)
Infinito (Tzadik, 2009)
Caym: Book of Angels Volume 17 (Tzadik, 2011) 
With Christina Courtin
Christina Courtin (Nonesuch, 2009)
With Eyal Maoz
Peasant Songs (Piadrum, 2002) - with Lemon Juice Quartet
Hope and Destruction (Tzadik, 2009)
With Ravish Momin's Trio Tarana
Climbing the Banyan Tree (Cleanfeed, 2005)
With Jon Madof
Rashanim (Tzadik, 2003)
Masada Rock (Tzadik, 2005) as Rashanim
Shalosh (Tzadik, 2006) as Rashanim
The Gathering (Tzadik, 2009) as Rashanim
Zion80 (Tzadik, 2013)
Adramelech: Book of Angels Volume 22 (Tzadik, 2014)
With Sean Noonan's Brewed by Noon
Set the Hammer Free (2010)
With Pharaoh's Daughter
Haran (OY, 2007)
With Pitom
Blasphemy and Other Serious Crimes (Tzadik, 2011)
With Jamie Saft
A Bag of Shells (Tzadik, 2010)
With Basya Schechter
Queen's Dominion (Tzadik, 2004)
Songs of Wonder (Tzadik, 2011)
With Daniel Zamir's Satlah
Satlah (Tzadik, 2000)
Exodus (Tzadik, 2001)
Children of Israel (Tzadik, 2002)
With John Zorn
Voices in the Wilderness (Tzadik, 2003)
The Unknown Masada (Tzadik, 2003)
Filmworks XV: Protocols of Zion (Tzadik, 2005)
Filmworks XVI: Workingman's Death (Tzadik, 2005)
Filmworks XVII: Notes on Marie Menken/Ray Bandar: A Life with Skulls (Tzadik, 2006)
Filmworks XVIII: The Treatment (Tzadik, 2006)
Filmworks XXI: Belle de Nature/The New Rijksmuseum (Tzadik, 2008)
In Search of the Miraculous (Tzadik, 2010)
Mount Analogue (Tzadik, 2012)
With dálava
dálava (dalavamusic.com, 2014)

References

American male bass guitarists
1975 births
Living people
Musicians from Brooklyn
Avant-garde jazz bass guitarists
Manhattan School of Music alumni
Berklee College of Music alumni
Pharaoh's Daughter members
Guitarists from New York (state)
American oud players
21st-century American bass guitarists
21st-century American male musicians
American male jazz musicians